Lake Avenue may refer to:

Lake Avenue (Baltimore)
Lake Avenue (Pasadena)
 Florida State Road 802 in Palm Beach County, locally known east as Lake Avenue
Lake Avenue (Staten Island Railway station)